The Chuckwalla Valley is a large valley in eastern Riverside County, California, named for a large lizard, the chuckwalla found in the arid Southwestern United States deserts.

The region of the valley in southeast California, is the low elevation section of the Mojave Desert transitioning into the Colorado Desert, the northwest extension (in California) of the Sonoran Desert. The region is notable for valleys containing bajadas, sand dunes, and intermittent, dry, or saline lakes. Chuckwalla Valley contains Ford Lake (Ford Dry Lake) in the east-southeast; Palen Lake (Palen Dry Lake) occurs in the center-northwest, at the south terminus of the smaller, north-south Palen Valley.

The south end of the valley expands slightly northwest-by-southeast, and contains Danby Dry Lake, a 13-mi (21 km)

See also
Desert Center, California
Valleys of Riverside County

References

External links
Ford Lake (Ford Dry Lake), coordinates & elevation at topozone.com

Endorheic basins of the United States
Valleys of the Mojave Desert
Valleys of Riverside County, California